Beylice can refer to:

 Beylice, Sungurlu
 Beylice, Tarsus